The Riffs are a rock and roll and punk band from Portland, Oregon. They have released three full-length albums, all on indie labels, namely Pelado Records, Vendetta Records, and TKO Records.

Influences 
The Riffs are heavily influenced by early punk bands, most notably the Sex Pistols, whose influence can be heard most prominently in the guitars, Sham 69 and the Dead Boys (they paid tribute to the Dead Boys on the cover of "Dead End Dream"). Like other bands that played the first wave of punk music, they were also fans of Protopunk like Eddie and the Hot Rods and The Velvet Underground, as displayed by their cover of "Waiting for My Man" on Underground Kicks.

Song Content  
Throughout the first two LPs, Underground Kicks and Dead End Dream, the songs and lyrics (written by all members of the band) tell a bleak story of growing up in the Portland punk scene, presumably in poverty, afflicted with drug addiction, the repercussions of drug abuse, regret about past violent criminal activity, and a "No Way Out" feeling when it came to creating a fulfilling (if any) future.

The band matured for their latest release, Death or Glory, as evident by lead singer Mengis' improved vocal abilities; also, he achieved a greater vocal range, such as in "Death or Glory," smoother production, and implementation of experimental instruments (such as the keyboard in "Poison Boys"). The lyrical content also took a turn for the positive in many ways; Death or Glory had considerably more romantic songs than ever before.

Members 
Tony Mengis - Vocals
Dogs Body - Guitars and vocals
Alex Hagen - Guitars and vocals
Scott Goto - Bass
Joey O'Brien - Drums

Past Members 
Amphetamine Blue - Guitars, backup vocals
Saigon Shakes - Guitar, then Bass
Karl - drummer
Toni Transmission - first drummer

Discography

Albums
Underground Kicks (released 1999 by Pelado Records, re-released December 17, 2002 by TKO Records)
Dead End Dream (March 19, 2002)
Death or Glory (May 20, 2003)

EPs
"The Lucky Ones are Dead" B/W "Johnny Won't Get to Heaven" 7" on Pelado Records
"White Line Kids" B/W "Kick Time Suicide" 7" released in 2000 on Tombstone Records
"A Million Scars" B/W "Outta my Mind and I Won't" 7" on Vendetta Records
"Such a Bore" B/W "Coming Back" 7" on TKO Records
"Poison Boys" B/W "Lesson Number Nine" 7" released in 2003 on TKO Records

References

External links
The Riffs on Myspace

Punk rock groups from Oregon
Musical groups from Portland, Oregon